Choo-Choo Charles is a 2022 indie horror video game developed and published by Two Star Games. The player controls a monster-hunting archivist with the goal of upgrading their train's defenses in order to fight and defeat the titular character, Charles, an evil spider-train hybrid monster that wanders the landscape looking for people to eat. The game received mixed reviews from critics.

Gameplay 
Gameplay consists of travelling across an open world map in a train, performing tasks for non-player characters, collecting loot, and using that loot to upgrade the train in order to fight against Charles, who periodically hunts for the player and can be fought off using the gun mounted to it. The goal of the game is to collect three glowing eggs that will summon Charles to battle the player as a final boss. The game takes players around three to five hours to fully complete.

The map is an island lined with interconnected railway tracks, which carry the player's train to a series of locations where quests can be completed for non-player characters. There are four main NPCs that progress the main quest. Besides Charles, the player also faces armed cultist enemies, who guard the three glowing eggs needed to complete the game. The game encourages players to use stealth to sneak past these guards to steal the eggs and escape without notice, although it is also possible to simply run past them and kill them with the train's gun. The game's optional quests generally consist of fetching objects for non-player characters, in exchange for new weapons and other rewards.

Plot 
The player controls an unnamed archivist and monster hunter (simply known as "the Archivist"), who is summoned to the island of Aranearum to deal with Charles, who is described as "half train, half giga-spider" by their friend Eugene. Upon arrival, Charles attacks them, killing Eugene, but not before he tells the player to find Charles' eggs, which the Archivist can use to summon and fight Charles, and gives them a train mounted with a machine gun.

Eugene's son Paul and the inhabitants of the island have formulated a plan to defeat Charles, but they need the Archivist to execute it. The Archivist is given the goal of traversing the island to meet with various non-player characters. These characters give the Archivist keys to the mines where Charles' glowing eggs are located, scraps with which to upgrade the train, and weapons like a flamethrower, rocket launcher, and anti-tank cannon to better fend off Charles. The Archivist also comes into contact with cultists led by Warren Charles III, who seemingly plan on using Charles for world domination. The Archivist also learns that Warren is responsible for causing Charles' awakening, having owned a mining company that dug too deep, discovering Charles' eggs.

After collecting all three eggs, the Archivist summons Charles, who transforms into "Hell Charles" and kills Warren before attacking the Archivist. After a grueling battle, the Archivist successfully lures Charles onto a bridge that they and Paul rigged with explosives, and detonates it, sending Charles plummeting face-first onto a large metal pole, instantly killing him.

However, in a post-credits scene, it is revealed that Charles has multiple eggs hiding in a cavern, indicating his return.

Development and release 
Choo-Choo Charles was developed by Gavin Eisenbeisz on his own using Unreal Engine. He recorded the development process in blogs on YouTube.

Choo-Choo Charles was inspired by Charlie the Choo-Choo, a 2016 children's book written by Stephen King as part of The Dark Tower series, as well as Thomas the Tank Engine.

The game was released for Windows on December 9, 2022, although Eisenbeisz has plans to port the game to consoles as well.

Reception 

After the first trailer was released in 2021, it went viral on the internet, provoking reactions on websites such as Twitter and Reddit.

Choo-Choo Charles received a 53/100 on review aggregate site Metacritic, indicating "mixed or average reviews".

Steve Hogarty of Rock Paper Shotgun described the game as "shonky, very short and frustrating to play for any length of time". He said that the game had a good concept, but that the concept was stretched too thinly. Zack Zweizen of Kotaku criticized the game for its reliance on "bad stealth sections", a lack of scares, and the short length of the game. Travis Northup from IGN gave the game a score of 4/10, describing it as "janky", "barebones", and "more dull than [he] thought possible". He also described the on-foot stealth sections as "aggressively not fun". Zoey Handley from Destructoid scored the game 6.5/10, describing it as "alright".

References 

2022 video games
2020s horror video games
Adventure games
Indie video games
Unreal Engine games
Railroad games
Parody video games